Imae Station is an infill station on the Bundang Line of the Seoul Subway. There were originally no plans for this station when the Bundang Line opened in 1994. However, due to local resident demand and the significant distance between Yatap and Seohyeon Stations, construction began in March 2000 and the station was opened on January 16, 2004.

The station became a transfer station for the Gyeonggang Line when operations commenced on September 24, 2016.

Station Layout

Suin-Bundang Line

Gyeonggang Line

Vicinity
Exit 1: Seongnam Arts Center
Exit 2: Seongnam Agricultural Technology Center

Gallery

References

Bundang
Seoul Metropolitan Subway stations
Railway stations opened in 2004
Metro stations in Seongnam